Carlford is a hundred of Suffolk, consisting of .

It is bounded on the south by Colneis Hundred, on the east by Wilford Hundred and the River Deben, on the north by Loes Hundred  and on the west by Bosmere and Claydon Hundred and the borough of Ipswich. It falls in the Deanery of Carlford, and in the Archdeaconry of Suffolk.

The southern part of the hundred running from the bounds of Ipswich to Woodbridge and the River Deben has generally a light sandy soil, whereas in its northern parts a rich loam prevails.

Listed as Carleford in the Domesday Book, the name has the structure "carla ford", meaning "ford of the churls (peasants)".

Greenwich, Ipswich was listed as "Grenewic", which means a “green farmstead”, was listed as being in Carlford Hundred in the Doomsday book, but was subsequently integrated into Ipswich as part of St Clement's Parish.

Parishes

Carlford Hundred consists of the following 18 parishes:

References

Hundreds of Suffolk